Heatherdale railway station is located on the Lilydale and Belgrave lines in Victoria, Australia. It serves the eastern Melbourne suburb of Ringwood, and opened on 7 September 1958.

History
Heatherdale station opened on 7 September 1958, and was named after the locality of the same name, itself named after "Heatherdale", a farm that was owned by William Witt.

When the station opened, it was located west of the former Heatherdale Road level crossing, which was provided with boom barriers in that year.

In 2007, Heatherdale was upgraded as part of the EastLink tollway project, with the works funded by ConnectEast. Upgrades included extra parking spaces, upgraded lighting and security measures, a new pedestrian crossing at Heatherdale Road and construction of new station buildings. The original station buildings were demolished and new shelters built. New lighting and signage was also installed along the platforms. The station buildings from 2007 were demolished 9 years later, due to the level crossing removal works.

In mid-2015, the Level Crossing Removal Authority announced its intention to proceed with the removal of the Heatherdale Road level crossing, together with the rebuilding of the station. In September of that year, an alliance including Leighton Contractors, Aurecon and Hyder Consulting was formally awarded the contract. Work started in early 2016, with the level crossing removed by early February 2017. The rebuilt station opened on 6 February of that year, and was relocated to the east of the former level crossing.

There are three separate car parking areas that serve Heatherdale station. One is just to the north of Platform 2 and is accessible from Heatherdale Road. A second car park is beside the railway line on the eastern side of Heatherdale Road, stretching towards EastLink and was redeveloped as part of the Level Crossing Removal Project. The Heatherdale Road entrance no longer serves as an exit, but a new section has been added between the railway line and Maroondah Highway, and provides as the exit and entrance. A third parking area surrounds the power transmission pylons on Molan Street. A fourth car park, accessed from Newman Street, opened in June 2013, to replace the car parks that were removed at Mitcham during the Mitcham Road crossing removal works.

Platforms and services
Heatherdale has two side platforms. It is served by Lilydale and Belgrave line trains.

Platform 1:
  all stations and limited express services to Flinders Street
  all stations and limited express services to Flinders Street

Platform 2:
  all stations services to Lilydale
  all stations services to Belgrave

Transport links
Kinetic Melbourne operates one SmartBus route via Heatherdale station, under contract to Public Transport Victoria:
  : Frankston station – Melbourne Airport

Ventura Bus Lines operates one route via Heatherdale station, under contract to Public Transport Victoria:
 : Ringwood station – Chadstone Shopping Centre

Gallery

References

External links
 
 Melway map at street-directory.com.au

Railway stations in Melbourne
Railway stations in Australia opened in 1958
Ringwood, Victoria
Railway stations in the City of Maroondah